Michael Arnoldovich Belov (born 21 November 2001) is a Russian racing driver currently competing in the Formula Regional European Championship with MP Motorsport.

Career

Formula 4
Belov started his professional single-seater career in the SMP F4 Championship in 2017 with the SMP Racing team. Belov claimed his first podium finish on the final race of the season with a third-place, finishing eighth overall in the championship. He continued in the championship for the 2018 season, claiming his first win at the second round in the NRING Circuit, winning races 1 and 3. He ended the season with five wins, finishing second in the championship behind Konsta Lappalainen.

In 2019, Belov joined the Italian F4 Championship with the Italian Bhai Tech Racing team. He finished on the podium in the first two races. It was later announced that Belov would also contest the 2019 ADAC Formula 4 Championship starting from the second round. Belov won one race in ADAC F4 at the Sachsenring, finishing eighth in the championship. Belov failed to win during his Italian F4 campaign, however, finished second on five occasions, ending the season fourth in the championship.

Formula Renault
At the end of 2019, Belov participated in the post-season Formula Renault Eurocup rookie test. Due to the COVID-19 pandemic, the 2020 Formula Renault Eurocup season was disrupted and postponed. As a consequence, Reece Ushijima, who was previously announced to drive for Belgian team M2 Competition withdrew due to travel restrictions. On 2 July 2020, M2 Competition announced that Michael Belov would drive for them for the full 2020 season.

Formula 3
Following the Barcelona round of the 2020 FIA Formula 3 Championship, David Schumacher left Charouz Racing System to join Carlin Racing instead. Belov was brought in to replace him for the remainder of the Formula 3 season. 
Belov remained with the team throughout post-season and pre-season testing and was expected to be given a drive for the 2021 season, however, Enzo Fittipaldi was announced instead.

Formula Regional European Championship

2021 
Belov joined JD Motorsport in the 2021 Formula Regional European Championship as a wildcard entrant for the fourth round at Circuit Paul Ricard. Despite not being eligible for points, he had a strong race weekend and earned two podium finishes. Following this, it was announced Belov would race with G4 Racing for the remainder of the championship. Belov secured two victories and ending the campaign eighth.

2022 
Belov joined the 2022 Formula Regional Asian Championship for the final three rounds of the season. He scored a second place in his second race and was 12th in the championship.

Karting record

Karting career summary

Racing record

Racing career summary 

* Season still in progress.

Complete SMP F4 Championship results 
(key) (Races in bold indicate pole position) (Races in italics indicate fastest lap)

Complete Italian F4 Championship results 
(key) (Races in bold indicate pole position) (Races in italics indicate fastest lap)

Complete ADAC Formula 4 Championship results
(key) (Races in bold indicate pole position) (Races in italics indicate fastest lap)

Complete Formula Regional Asian Championship results 
(key) (Races in bold indicate pole position) (Races in italics indicate fastest lap)

* Season still in progress.

Complete Formula Renault Eurocup results
(key) (Races in bold indicate pole position) (Races in italics indicate fastest lap)

Complete FIA Formula 3 Championship results
(key) (Races in bold indicate pole position; races in italics indicate points for the fastest lap of top ten finishers)

Complete Formula Regional European Championship results 
(key) (Races in bold indicate pole position) (Races in italics indicate fastest lap)

* Season still in progress.

Notes

References

External links
 

2001 births
Living people
 Russian racing drivers
Sportspeople from Moscow
F3 Asian Championship drivers
Formula Regional Asian Championship drivers
Formula Regional European Championship drivers
FIA Formula 3 Championship drivers
Charouz Racing System drivers
JD Motorsport drivers
Bhaitech drivers
R-ace GP drivers
M2 Competition drivers
MP Motorsport drivers
SMP F4 Championship drivers
SMP Racing drivers
ADAC Formula 4 drivers
Italian F4 Championship drivers
BlackArts Racing drivers